Kirkoswald may refer to:

 Kirkoswald, Cumbria, a civil parish and village in the District of Eden, England
 Kirkoswald, South Ayrshire, a village in South Ayrshire council area, Scotland